Justin McDonald (born 21 March 1983) is a British actor of film, television and theatre.

Early life
Justin Mark McDonald was born in Gateshead, Tyne and Wear in North East England. His keen interest in Art and Literature led him into acting at an early age and he was soon awarded a scholarship by the prestigious Italia Conti Academy of Theatre Arts in London where he gained a Bachelor of Arts Honours Degree in Acting.

Career
McDonald went on to complete his studies early in order to film on the television drama Distant Shores for ITV Granada, playing series regular Ben McCallister. Following this he has appeared in many acclaimed television productions such as Holby City, The Bill, Torchwood, Afterlife, Casualty, Emmerdale, Wolfblood and the crime detective series Inspector George Gently.

McDonald's first major film saw him appearing alongside Renée Zellweger and Ewan McGregor in the Beatrix Potter biopic Miss Potter as the young William Heelis, who encouraged the young Beatrix Potter to write and illustrate her stories. He then went on to appear in another British biopic playing Steve in And When Did You Last See Your Father? which starred Jim Broadbent and Colin Firth. The film was based on the memoirs of the same title written by Blake Morrison. More recently McDonald played a lead Detective in feature film Winter Ridge.

McDonald's stage debut came in 2010, playing the role of Klaus Voormann in the original stage adaptation of Backbeat. The untold story of The Beatles during their early Hamburg days.

As well as acting on stage and screen, McDonald is an accomplished voice over artist. He played the voice of Frank Simmons in the critically acclaimed Nintendo Wii Video Game Cursed Mountain. His voice career has also led him to the Monty Python comedy troupe, playing the voice of young David Sherlock in the animated feature film A Liar's Autobiography: The Untrue Story of Monty Python's Graham Chapman

Personal life
He married actress Kate Hodgson in the Lake District in 2013.

Selected work

Awards and nominations 

In 2023, McDonald won a Royal Television Society award for drama performance of the year in British Film Institute short film Fist.

References

External links 
 
Justin McDonald at the Film & TV Database of the British Film Institute
Miss Potter Movie
Justin McDonald at the website of Just Voices

21st-century English male actors
English male film actors
English male stage actors
English male television actors
English male voice actors
Actors from Gateshead
Living people
1983 births
Alumni of the Italia Conti Academy of Theatre Arts